Amer Al-Amer  is a Kuwaiti football forward who played for Kuwait in the 1984 Asian Cup.

Honours 

Asian Cup:
Third Place : 1984

References

External links
Stats

Kuwait international footballers
Kuwaiti footballers
1984 AFC Asian Cup players
Living people
Association football forwards
Year of birth missing (living people)
Kuwait Premier League players